Batısandal  (meaning "west sandalwood" named after Santalum album, a common tree) is a village in Erdemli district of Mersin Province, Turkey. It is situated in the hilly region to the south of the Taurus Mountains. The population of the village is 748  as of 2012.

The village was founded by a Turkmen clan from Central Asia. Initially named Kelete, it was administratively included in Limonlu. In 1929, it was declared a village. There are historical ruins around the village such as an archaeological site (named Öküzlü), a church and Ottoman tombstones of the early 19th century. Main products of the village are vegetables and fruits. Olive and Laurus are also produced.

References

Villages in Erdemli District